Xscape is the second posthumous album by American singer-songwriter Michael Jackson. It was released on May 9, 2014, by Epic Records, MJJ Music and Sony Music Entertainment. Xscape is the tenth release by Sony and/or Motown since Jackson's death in 2009. L.A. Reid, chairman of Epic Records, curated and served as executive producer for the album, enlisting Timbaland to lead a team of record producers, including StarGate, Jerome "J-Roc" Harmon, John McClain, and Rodney Jerkins, to remix and contemporize the eight selected tracks. The album was #1 in its first week of release in worldwide sales.

The standard version of Xscape features eight tracks, each reworked from 2013 to 2014, whilst the deluxe version also includes the original versions of the songs which were recorded from 1980 to 1999, a bonus track and two videos. Xscape was promoted across the Sony group of companies; Sony Mobile used a snippet of "Slave to the Rhythm" in their advertising campaign for the Xperia Z2 mobile phone. A Pepper's ghost illusion of Jackson performed "Slave to the Rhythm" at the 2014 Billboard Music Awards in May 2014.

Xscape debuted at number two on the Billboard 200 and number one on the Billboard Top R&B/Hip-Hop Albums chart in the United States. The album was preceded by the release of its lead single, "Love Never Felt So Good", which includes a newly recorded version featuring Justin Timberlake. It reached number nine on the Billboard Hot 100 in the US, giving Jackson his first posthumous top ten and his first since "You Rock My World" in 2001. Additionally, "Love Never Felt So Good" became Jackson's highest charting single on the Hot 100 since his final number one, "You Are Not Alone", in 1995. A second single, "A Place with No Name", was released later that year. Xscape received generally positive reviews and was certified gold by the Recording Industry Association of America (RIAA).

Background
Xscape was the second album of all new music released by Epic Records after Jackson's death in 2009. It was announced on March 31, 2014. It features eight tracks originally recorded between 1983 and 2001.

The title track "Xscape" was recorded in 1999 for Jackson's tenth studio album, Invincible. American producer Timbaland and Epic Records chairman and CEO L.A. Reid were executive producers, with additional production from Rodney Jerkins, StarGate and John McClain. Timbaland said that Reid had personally approached him at his home to discuss the new Jackson project. Jesse Johnson, former lead guitarist of the American band the Time worked on elements of a song that featured Mary J. Blige, Questlove, and D'Angelo. The track was not included in the album.

Reid said that they wanted to honor Jackson's legacy when naming the album: "The title of this album (Xscape) honors Michael's album naming process. He always chose a song from the album to name his projects and, beginning with Thriller, used only one word titles, each with an edgy quality to them (Thriller, Bad, Dangerous, HIStory and Invincible)."

Recording history
"Love Never Felt So Good" was co-written by Canadian singer-songwriter Paul Anka and was originally recorded in 1980 as a demo with Anka on the piano. The song was also recorded by American entertainer Johnny Mathis. A duet version of the song with Justin Timberlake was recorded and released as a single – the duet version of the song features percussion and breaths from Jackson's 1979 song "Working Day and Night".

"Chicago" (originally called "She Was Lovin' Me") was recorded in 1999 but failed to make the Invincible album.

"Loving You" was recorded in 1985 during the Bad sessions.

"A Place with No Name" was written and recorded in 1998. The track is based on "A Horse with No Name", the 1972 single American rock band America. A 24-second snippet was leaked online by TMZ in July 2009 and a full version was leaked in December 2013.

"Slave to the Rhythm" was recorded during the Dangerous sessions in 1990. A Tricky Stewart remix version leaked on the internet in 2010, which was intended for the first posthumous album, Michael. Justin Bieber also recorded a "duet version" featured with Jackson's vocals, which was leaked in August 2013. The Michael Jackson Estate afterwards stated that they had not authorized the release of this recording.

"Do You Know Where Your Children Are" was written and recorded during the "Bad" sessions. However, the song was later picked up and reworked for the Dangerous album but did not make the cut. The version appearing on Xscape was recorded in 1986.

"Blue Gangsta" was written and recorded in 1998 but failed to make the Invincible album. Rapper Tempamental remixed the song without Jackson's permission and made it available on his MySpace web page in late 2006. The remix titled "Gangsta (No Friend of Mine)" featured Pras of the Fugees.

"Xscape" was written and recorded in 1999 during the Invincible recording sessions but failed to make the album. It was completed in 2001 and leaked on the internet the following year. The song was given a modern spin by its original producer, Rodney Jerkins, and features samples of "You Rock My World", a song recorded in the same era.

Promotion and singles
Two official singles, "Love Never Felt So Good" and "A Place with No Name", were released from Xscape. "Slave to the Rhythm" was the first song announced for the album.

In February 2014, Sony and Jackson's estate announced a partnership with Sony Mobile that saw the release of an ad incorporating a new version of the track "Slave to the Rhythm", which was confirmed as one of the album tracks. The commercial advertisement was for Sony Mobile's Xperia Z2 mobile phone. The album had been aired to the UK media in the basement of a Knightsbridge hotel on March 31, 2014. The journalists were permitted to hear the album once without any electronic devices, and song titles were kept secret. The entertainment correspondents for some UK media, such as Sky News, London Evening Standard, The Daily Telegraph, Mixmag, The Guardian and Digital Spy were invited.

On April 30, it was revealed that "Love Never Felt So Good" would be unveiled at the iHeartRadio Music Awards on May 1 as the album's first single, contradicting statements by Timbaland that suggested that "Chicago" would be released first. It was co-written by Canadian singer-songwriter Paul Anka, and features Justin Timberlake. "Love Never Felt So Good" was previously recorded by American entertainer Johnny Mathis. The digital download for the single became available on iTunes at 0:01 EDT on May 2, 2014 for the album version and the duet version with Justin Timberlake. The release date of the single to urban radio stations confirmed as May 6, 2014. On May 4, the track "Chicago" became available to Music Unlimited subscribers, being followed by "Loving You", "A Place with No Name", "Slave to the Rhythm", and "Do You Know Where Your Children Are" in the succeeding days.

The Xscape standard and Deluxe Editions were available for pre-order beginning April 1 on iTunes.com/MichaelJackson and elsewhere, and available at all retailers worldwide on May 13.

A Pepper's ghost illusion of Michael Jackson performed "Slave to the Rhythm" at the 2014 Billboard Music Awards on May 18, 2014. The performance was choreographed by the Talauega brothers and was directed by Jamie King. A day after the coverage, the "live" performance of "Slave to the Rhythm" was uploaded to Michael Jackson's VEVO YouTube channel.

Following the success of "Love Never Felt So Good" on the Billboard Hot 100, the song rocketed into the iTunes Top 5 in the US, peaking at #1 in 17 countries and landing in the Top 5 in 67 countries around the world, within 24 hours of release. "Love Never Felt So Good" marks Jackson's 49th Hot 100 entry and it made multiple debuts on various radio formats charts. Jackson became the first solo artist to have a single reach the top 10 in six different decades, (1960's 70's 80's 90's 2000's & 10's). "Slave to the Rhythm", which debuted at number 45 on the Billboard charts, was Jackson's 50th Hot 100 hit.

Critical reception

Xscape has a score of 66 out of 100 on Metacritic, based on 22 critics, indicating generally favorable reviews. Prior to the album release, Xscape was played for critics at exclusive album listening parties in New York City. Bernadette McNulty from The Daily Telegraph praised the album as "pristine", noting the "front-and-center presence of Jackson's voice in the mix". Michael Cragg from The Guardian said Xscape feels "like an album created to showcase a handful of Jackson songs that on the whole deserve to be heard". Richard Suchet from Sky News thought the album "sound[ed] more like modern-day remixes". Nick Stevenson from Mixmag asserted that the album was "more like a collection of B-sides from Off the Wall than a follow-up to Invincible".

Michael Arceneaux from Ebony said "the upcoming project 'from' the late singer sounds like a recipe for legacy tarnishing". Elysa Gardner of USA Today said that the producers on the album "ensure that Jackson's enduring strengths as a singer are represented, layering in modern electronic textures without overwhelming the distinctly slinky, shivery vocals or overall structure of the tunes." Other critics suggested the product was just a way to promote Sony smartphones, and had questions about the songwriting and production, or with the singing. Jackson fan Nekesa Mumbi Moody, writing for Yahoo, said that much of the album had a dated feel, with "A Place with No Name" having poor lyrics and sound. She concluded that "putting out music that falls below Jackson's standards detracts from the carefully constructed catalog he spent decades creating and protecting."

Commercial performance
Xscape became Jackson's tenth UK number-one album after it debuted atop the UK Albums Chart with 47,764 first-week sales. Currently, sales of the album in the United Kingdom stand at 135,500 copies and has been certified gold by the British Phonographic Industry. The album also debuted at number one in Belgium, Denmark, France, and Spain. It debuted at number two on the US Billboard charts with first-week sales of 157,000 copies in the United States. In its second week of sales, the album sold 67,000 more copies. In its third week it sold 35,000 copies bringing its total sales to 259,000 copies. In its fourth week, it sold a little more than 25,000 copies, and the fifth week it sold a little less than 25,000 copies. On September 18, 2014 the album was certified Gold in the US, selling 500 000 copies up to that date.

In Canada, the album debuted at number three on the Canadian Albums Chart, selling 12,000 copies.

Track listing

Notes
  signifies a co-producer
  signifies a vocal producer

Personnel
Credits adapted from Xscape album liner notes.

 Michael Jackson – lead and background vocals, producer (1, 9–12, 14–16), vocal producer (2–4, 6–8, 17)
 Dayna Anderson – violin (tracks 5–7, 17)
 Paul Anka – producer and original piano (track 1), piano (9), vocal producer (17)
 Babyface – vocal producer (track 5), producer and keyboards (13)
 Paul Bailey – assistant engineer (tracks 3, 6)
 Cheryl Banks – production coordination
 Davis Barnett – viola (tracks 5–7, 17)
 Michelle Bishop – violin (tracks 5–7)
 Adam Blackstone — bass (track 17)
 Bill Bottrell — engineer (track 14)
 John Branca – executive producer
 Stuart Brawley — engineer and second engineer (track 16)
 Greg Burns — second engineer (tracks 12, 16)
 Jeff Burns — second engineer (tracks 12, 15, 16)
 Brad Buxer — keyboards (track 15)
 Demacio "Demo" Castellon – engineer (tracks 6, 17), mixing (17)
 Jeff Chestek – engineer (tracks 5–7, 17)
 Vadim Chislov – assistant engineer (tracks 6, 17), assistant mixing (17)
 Eliza Cho – violin (tracks 5–7)
 Cody Cichowski — assistant engineer (track 17)
 Nina Cottman — viola (track 17)
 LaShawn Daniels – background vocals (tracks 8, 16)
 Arlia de Ruiter – violin (track 1)
 Eddie Delena — engineer (track 12)
 Jeroen de Rijk – percussion (track 1)
 C.J. DeVillar — bass and assistant engineer (track 12), engineer (15)
 Alex DeYoung – assistant engineer (track 1)
 Chris Desmond — engineer (track 11)
 John Doelp – associate producer
 Guillame Combet — violin (track 17)
 Mike Donaldson – engineer and additional vocal editing (track 8)
 Craig Durrance — second engineer (track 16)
 Eric — drums and percussion (track 15)
 Sean Erick — horns (track 17)
 Mikkel S. Eriksen – producer, engineer, and instrumentation (track 4)
 Blake Espy – violin (tracks 5–7, 17)
 Mike Daddy Evans – production coordination
 Glenn Fischbach — cello (track 17)
 Matt Forger — engineer (tracks 11, 14)
 Rick Frazier – production coordination
 Dr. Freeze – vocal producer (tracks 4, 7), producer and background vocals (12, 15), synths, horns, and meows (15)
 Brian "Big Bass" Gardner – mastering (tracks 1–8, 17)
 Humberto Gatica — engineer (track 12)
 Brad Gilderman — engineer (track 16)
 Mike Ging — engineer (tracks 12, 15)
 Chris Godbey – engineer (tracks 2, 3, 5, 6, 17), mixing (2, 3, 5–7, 17)
 Larry Gold – string arrangements (tracks 5–8, 17)
 Franny Graham — second engineer (track 16)
 Bernie Grundman — mastering (tracks 9–16)
 Fredrik Strand Halland – guitar (track 8)
 Jerome "J-Roc" Harmon – co-producer (tracks 2, 3, 5–7), producer (17)
 Trehy Harris – mixing (track 8)
 Harvey — percussion (track 16)
 Tor Erik Hermansen – producer and instrumentation (track 4)
 Jerry Hey – original horns (track 7), horns (15)
 Kevin Hissink – guitar (track 1)
 Mieke Honingh – violin (track 1)
 Jean-Marie Horvat — engineer (track 16)
 Norman Jansen – violin (track 1)
 Rodney "Darkchild" Jerkins – producer (tracks 8, 16); vocal producer, engineer, and mixing (8); background vocals and mouth percussion (16)
 Perry Jimenez – assistant engineer (tracks 2, 5), engineer (7)
 Dan Johnson — second engineer (track 12)
 Brandon Jones – engineer (track 7)
 Daniel Jones – producer (track 7)
 Michael Jorgersen — violin (track 17)
 Jaycen Joshua – mixing (track 8)
 Julia Jowett – violin (track 1)
 Tommy Joyner — assistant engineer (track 17)
 A. Kilhoffer — second engineer (track 16)
 Jonathan Kim – viola (tracks 5–7, 17)
 Sarah Koch – violin (track 1)
 Wim Kok – violin (track 1)
 Rutger "Ruffi" Kroese – drum programming and assistant engineer (track 1)
 Emma Kummrow – violin (tracks 5–7, 17)
 Vera Laporeva – violin (track 1)
 Jennifer Lee — violin (track 17)
 Tamae Lee – violin (tracks 5–7, 17)
 Arend Liefkes – bass (track 1)
 Elisabeth Liefkes-Cats – violin (track 1)
 King Solomon Logan – producer (track 7)
 Jennie Lorenzo – cello (tracks 5–7, 17)
 Luigi Mazzocchi – violin (tracks 5–7)
 Steve McAuley — second engineer (track 16)
 John McClain – executive producer, producer (track 1)
 Paul McKenna — engineer (track 13)
 Ranaan L. Meyer – bass (tracks 5–7)
 Erica Miller – violin (tracks 5–7)
 Mo Horns – horns (track 8)
 Jesús Morales – cello (tracks 5–7)
 Greg Morgan – break editing & sound design (track 8)
 Cole Nystrom – assistant engineer (track 1)
 Adam Olmsted — assistant engineer (track 12), second engineer (15)
 Charles Parker – violin (tracks 5–7, 17)
 David Peijnenburg – violin (track 1)
 Dave Pensado – mixing (track 1)
 Karl Petersen – assistant engineer (tracks 5–7)
 Greg Phillinganes — Minimoog (track 15)
 Larry Phillabaum — second engineer (track 16)
 Paul Power – engineer (track 1)
 Antonio "L.A." Reid – vocal producer (track 5); producer, drums, and percussion (13); music coordinator
 Daniela Rivera – additional/assistant engineer (track 4)
 Kevin "Kayo" Roberson – bass (track 13)
 Cory Rooney – vocal producer (track 2), producer (10)
 Carlos Rubio – violin (tracks 5–7)
 Thom Russo — second engineer (track 13)
 Rafa Sardina — second engineer (track 15)
 Marcel Schimscheimer – bass (track 1)
 Leon Silva — horns (track 17)
 Renee Steffy-Warnick – viola (tracks 5–7)
 Bruce Swedien — engineer (tracks 13, 16)
 Tom Sweeney — second engineer (track 15)
 David Swope — assistant engineer (track 10)
 Phil Tan – mixing (track 4)
 Annie Tangberg – cello (track 1)
 Pauline Terlouw – violin (track 1)
 Timbaland – executive producer, producer (tracks 2, 3, 5–7, 17)
 Justin Timberlake — lead vocals, co-producer (track 17)
 Steve Tirpak – copyist and assistant to string arranger (tracks 5–7, 17)
 Giorgio Tuinfort – producer, drum programming, and additional piano (track 1)
 Vera Van Der Bie – violin (track 1)
 Franck van der Heijden – orchestral arrangements and conductor (track 1)
 Bastiaan Van Der Werf – cello (track 1)
 Herman Van Haaren – violin (track 1)
 Mark Ward – cello (tracks 5–7)
 Dan Warner – guitar (tracks 2, 6, 17)
 Matt Weber – assistant mixing (tracks 2, 3, 5–7, 17)
 David Williams – original guitar solo (track 6), guitar solo (14)
 Kevin Williams — horns (track 17)
 Robb Williams — engineer (track 10)
 Mat Maitland — cover imagery, art direction and design
 Cover containing photographic element by Bill Nation

Charts

Weekly charts

Monthly charts

Year-end charts

Certifications and sales

Release history

See also
 List of unreleased songs recorded by Michael Jackson
 List of music released posthumously

References

External links
 

2014 compilation albums
Michael Jackson compilation albums
Albums produced by Michael Jackson
Albums produced by Timbaland
Albums produced by Jerome "J-Roc" Harmon
Albums produced by Rodney Jerkins
Albums produced by Stargate
Albums produced by Babyface (musician)
Albums produced by Cory Rooney
Albums produced by L.A. Reid
Epic Records compilation albums
MJJ Music compilation albums
Albums published posthumously